Astrological compatibility (synastry) is the branch of the pseudoscientific astrology, that is meant to show compatibility of romantic partners, but like with astrology that hasn't been linked to any real-life outcome for individuals, the planets in the sky have neither been shown to be any effect on compatibility in relationships when comparing natal horoscopes. A natal horoscope is a chart or map of the angles of the planets in the Solar System and their positions in the zodiac at the exact time of a person's birth. These angles represent the positive and negative relationships between the planets. These relationships describe the relationship between the two people under consideration. Compatibility between Zodiac signs is always approached within a particular branch of astrological tradition: Western astrology, Vedic astrology or Chinese astrology.

Compatibility in Western astrology 

This principle was most clearly demonstrated in modern times by the work of Carl Jung in his book Synchronicity. Jung was exploring the nature of coincidence for a study. He was offered a collection of over 400 pairs of horoscopes of married couples for this purpose. Jung randomized half of the pairs of horoscopes and attempted to find the couples who were actually married. Jung found a correlation between the married couples that matched astrological prediction. Astonished, he questioned his influence in the study and repeated the experiment with the same results. He again changed his methods and again arrived at the results astrologers predicted. He could not find a causal relationship to explain his correlations, so he termed Synchronicity an acausal principle.

Compatibility in Indian astrology 

The Hindu/Indian system of examining compatibility based on horoscopes of the aspirant couple is unique. The fundamental concept of matching horoscopes emanates from constellations occupied by the Ascendant/Lagna (Lagna) at the time of births of bride and bridegroom. Individuals inherit qualities of the birth constellation. Various constellations represent different nature in respect of their casts, animals presented by them, sex, Gana (God/man/demon), humour, birds ruled, primordial elements, Gotra, directions ruled, consonants and vowels, mutual harmony and repulsion with certain stars, beneficence to the other stars by virtue of mutual distance etc.

In addition, a host of other factors such as longevity of the individuals, character (sexual), widowhood, poverty, progeny, body status, radical strengths and indications, planetary nature and afflictions, currency of major and minor periods, Marakaas (death inflicting planets), placement of Mars in their nativity (Mangal Dosha), time of query, omen (Shagun), antidotes, propitiations, auspicious time for marriage etc. should be examined to arrive at a suitable union of the couple.

Based on the birth constellations, the following aspects are examined Varna, Vashya, Tara, Yoni, Gana, Graha Maitri, Bhakoota, Nadi, Mahendra, Vedha, Rajju, Stree Deergha, Linga, Gotra, Varga and Yujja for checking compatibility.

In another system, only eight of these factors are given importance and are assigned numeric values - Varna (1 point), Vashya (2 Points), Tara (3 points), Yoni (4 points), Graha Maitri (5 points), Gana (6 points), Bhakoota (7 points) and Nadi (8 points). The total of these factors adds up to 36 points and a horoscope is considered to be matched only if the compatibility score is more than 18.

Significance of various aspects in compatibility are as follows:
 Varna: Grade of spiritual development, obedience
 Vashya: Mutual control – friendship.
 Tara: Mutual beneficence-luck-auspiciousness
 Yoni: Sexual aspects, affinity, urge, compatibility.
 Graha Maitri: Psychological disposition, friendship.
 Gana: Nature: Dev – Manush – Raakshas
 Bhakoota: Children, growth of family.
 Nadi: Temperaments, hereditary (astrological), affliction and death to other
 Mahendra: Promotes attachments, increase in longevity.
 Stree – Dergha: Service to husband.
 Rajju: Felicity and duration of married life.
 Vedha – Varga: Mutual repellence and enmity.
 Varga: Mutual friendship/enmity judged from their names
 Yujja: Type of mutual love – from one side – both sides.

Based on the above aspects, mathematical computation is performed to find a match. The logic is this - when two persons from different backgrounds come together, one has very little information on their compatibilities. This, using a statistical algorithm of planets and their positions are used to figure out. In certain cases need based matching is done and the astrologer has to use his skills in examining compatibility. It is felt essential to match the horoscopes before further marriage negotiations are done.

However it is explicitly mentioned in the ancient books that these matches are to be looked at only in the case of an arranged marriage. In a love marriage the match of minds is already existing and love overrides all these matches. If the minds are matching, horoscope matching has little relevance. Even if all the matches above are present or absent, the love marriage can proceed auspiciously. The above system is in practice for the last two millennia.

See also 
 Interpersonal compatibility

Further reading 
For astrological compatibility in western astrology, see:
 Jung, Carl G. (1993) [1952]. Synchronicity: An Acausal Connecting Principle. Bollingen, Switzerland: Bollingen Foundation. 
 Joseph F. Goodavage, Write Your Own Horoscope (1968, Hardcover) 
 The Diagram Group. (2004). "The Book of the Zodiac". Publisher: Sterling Publishing Co., Inc. 
 Ronald Davison. (1983). "Synastry: Understanding Human Relations Through Astrology". Publisher: Aurora Press, Inc. 
 E. W. Neville. (1997). "Planets in Synastry: Astrological Patterns of Relationships". Publisher: Whitford Press, Inc. 
 Christine Rakela. (2004). "Love Relationship Formula: Predicting Romantic Success with Astrology ". Publisher: Llewellyn Publications, Inc. 

For astrological compatibility in Indian Astrology
 H.Defouw - R.E.Svoboda (2000). "Light on Relationships: The Synastry of Indian Astrology". Publisher: Weiser Books. 
 V K Shridhar (2021). "HINDU ELECTIONAL ASTROLOGY". Publisher: Suvaas Publishers, India. the LONGEST BOOK ON ASTROLOGY . 

For astrological compatibility in Chinese astrology, see:
 Theodora Lau. (1997). "Chinese Horoscopes Guide to Relationships". Publisher: Doubleday Publishing. 
 Suzanne White. (1998). Chinese Astrology: Plain and Simple. Publisher: Tuttle Publishing. 
 Suzanne White. (1998) New Astrology: A Unique Synthesis of the World's Two Great Astrological Systems: The Chinese and Western
 Theodora Lau. (1999). Handbook of Chinese Horoscopes. Publisher: HarperCollins Publishers.

References 

Technical factors of Western astrology
Technical factors of Hindu astrology